Daniel Ferreira do Nascimento (born 28 July 1998) is a Brazilian long distance runner, owner of the best mark of a marathon runner born outside Africa and record holder in the Americas in the race.

In 2020 he took part in the World Athletics Half Marathon Championships, in Gdynia where he ran a personal best of 1:04:27 in the half marathon.

In December 2020, he won the 10,000m and finished 3rd place in 5000m at the Brazilian Championship at the COTP stadium in São Paulo.

He was selected to represent Brazil at the delayed 2020 Tokyo Olympic Games in the marathon after achieving the qualifying standard in his first marathon, winning "The Bicentennial of Peru" competition, in Lima, on May 23, with a time of 2h09m04s. On May 29, less than a week after securing Olympic qualification, Danielzinho, as he is known, won the 10,000m at the South American Championship in Guayaquil, Ecuador.

In April 2022, he broke the marathon Area Record for the Americas at the Seoul Marathon, finishing third in 02:04:51. It's the best mark in history made by a marathon runner born outside Africa. 

At the 2022 World Athletics Championships, he finished 8th in the Men's marathon, less than 1 minute from the medalists, having stayed in the main peloton until km 33. He led the 2022 New York Marathon before collapsing and requiring medical attention around mile 21 (km 32).

Personal bests
Outdoor
1500 metres – 3:46.85 (Campinas 2018)
5000 metres – 	14:17.07 (São Paulo 2020)
10000 metres – 28:40.17 (Rio de Janeiro 2022)
Half marathon – 1:01:03 (Rio de Janeiro 2022) 
Marathon – 2:04:51 (Seoul 2022)

References

External links

Brazilian male long-distance runners
1998 births
Living people
Sportspeople from São Paulo (state)
Athletes (track and field) at the 2020 Summer Olympics
Olympic athletes of Brazil
Olympic male marathon runners
South American Championships in Athletics winners
20th-century Brazilian people
21st-century Brazilian people